The 19301/19302 Dr. Ambedkar Nagar (Mhow)–Yesvantpur Weekly Express is an Express train belonging to Western Railway zone that runs between Dr. Ambedkar Nagar (Mhow) station of Indore, the largest city and commercial hub in the central Indian state of Madhya Pradesh and  in Bengaluru, the capital of Karnataka state.

Coach composition

The train consists of 20 coaches :

 2 AC II Tier
 4 AC III Tier
 7 Sleeper class
 1 Pantry car
 4 General Unreserved
 2 End-on Generator

Service

19301/ Dr. Ambedkar Nagar–Yesvantpur Weekly Express has an average speed of 50 km/hr and covers 1932 km in 38 hrs 55 mins.

19302/ Yesvantpur–Dr. Ambedkar Nagar Weekly Express has an average speed of 45 km/hr and covers 1932 km in 43 hrs 10 mins.

Route and halts

The important halts of the train are :

 
 
 
 
 
 
 
 
 
 
 
 
 Narkhed Junction
 
 
 
 
 
 
 
 
 
 Kamareddy

Schedule

Reversals

The train is reversed 3 times at:

Traction

After Akola Junction, both trains are hauled by a Krishnarajapuram Diesel Locomotive Shed-based WDP-4D up to Yesvantpur Junction, and vice versa.

See also

 
 
 Kochuveli–Indore Weekly Express

References

External links
 New Delhi–Chennai timetables
 Chennai–New Delhi timetables

Transport in Mhow
Transport in Bangalore
Railway services introduced in 2013
Rail transport in Madhya Pradesh
Express trains in India
Rail transport in Karnataka
Rail transport in Maharashtra
Rail transport in Telangana
Rail transport in Andhra Pradesh